O13 or O-13 may refer to:
 Curtiss O-13 Falcon, an observation aircraft of the United States Army Air Corps
 , a submarine of the Royal Netherlands Navy
 Oxygen-13, an isotope of oxygen
 Pyramid O-13, the hypothesized mortuary temple of Itzam Kʼan Ahk II
 , a submarine of the United States Navy

See also
013, a music venue in Tilburg, the Netherlands